Oas station is a railway station located on the South Main Line in Albay, Philippines. It was a flagstop currently at the Naga - Legazpi route of the Bicol Commuter. The only remnants of the station are the platform, bricks and a gate.

Philippine National Railways stations
Railway stations in Albay
Railway stations opened in 1914